Western Suburbs District Cricket Club is a cricket club in Graceville, Brisbane, Australia. They play in the Queensland Premier Cricket competition. They were founded in 1921.

See also

References

External links
 
 

Queensland District Cricket clubs
Sporting clubs in Brisbane
1921 establishments in Australia
Cricket clubs established in 1921